Moyse is a surname and a given name.

Surname
 Alec Moyse (1935–1994), English footballer
 Alphonse Moyse, Jr. (1898–1973), American bridge player, writer, and publisher and editor of The Bridge World
 Arthur Moyse (1914–2003), Anglo-Irish anarchist, artist and writer
 Blanche Honegger Moyse (1909–2011), Swiss-born American music conductor
 Clara Moyse Tadlock (1840–1926), British-born American poet and author
 Édouard Moyse (1827-1908), French painter and artist
 Heather Moyse (born 1978), Canadian multi-sport athlete
 John Moyse (died 1860), captured British soldier allegedly executed by Chinese soldiers for refusing to kow-tow to a general
 Louis Moyse (1912–2007), French flutist and composer
 Marcel Moyse (1889–1984), French flutist and father of Louis Moyse
 Walter Moyse (born 1981), Canadian basketball player and brother of Heather Moyse

Given name
 Moyse Alcan (1817–1869), French Jewish publisher, composer and poet
 Moyse Bayle (1755–between 1812 and 1815), French politician
 Moyse Louveture (1773–1801), military leader in Saint-Domingue during the Haitian Revolution
 Moyse Charas (1619–1698), French apothecary

See also
 Locotracteurs Gaston Moyse, French manufacturer of diesel shunting locomotives
 Moise (disambiguation)
 Moyes (disambiguation)
 Moyes surname
 Moyse Building

Masculine given names